The State Theatre in Traverse City, Michigan, United States was donated to the Traverse City Film Festival in May 2007 as a gift by Rotary Charities of Traverse City. The theater underwent restoration and was reopened on November 17, 2007. The Motion Picture Association of America listed the State Theatre as the #1 movie theater in the world.

The State Theatre is located on East Front Street in downtown Traverse City and was founded and built by Julius H. Steinberg in 1916 and named the Lyric Theater. It was rebuilt in 1923 after a fire. It showed the first talking movie seen in Northern Michigan in 1929 when it was known as the Lyric Theatre. It was destroyed by fire again in 1948 and was rebuilt in 1949 in an art deco style and renamed the State Theatre.  In 1978, the theater was twinned. It closed down in 1996, when the cinemas at the Grand Traverse Mall opened, and mall cinema owners GKC wanted business at those new theaters. GKC (now AMC) placed a deed restriction on subsequent owners of the State to prevent them from showing certain major Hollywood films. The theatre was revitalized before being used during the Traverse City Film Festival which began in July 2005. On November 17, 2007, the community celebrated the grand opening of the theater as a year-round art house.

As Lyric Theatre 
On July 4, 1916, Julius Steinberg opened the Lyric Theatre to complement his Grand Opera House immediately west of the property on Front Street. The Lyric opened with the silent film "The Iron Strain" starring Dustin Farnum. Ticket prices were 15¢ for adults and 5¢ for children.

On January 17, 1923, the Lyric was destroyed in a fire and subsequently reopened on December 20, 1923, with the movie Hearts Aflame based on the story “Timber” by local author Harold Titus. The Lyric showed silent films and also hosted weddings and other events.

In September 1927, Butterfield Theatres took over management of Lyric from the Fitzpatrick-McElroy chain. Con Foster, who worked for Fitzpatrick-McElroy, was retained as local manager for Butterfield, a position he held with only a brief interruption until his death on April 3, 1940.

At midnight on March 29, 1929, the Lyric showed “Lucky Boy” starring George Jessel, the first “talkie” film run in Traverse City. At this special showing, a short clip of Herbert Hoover’s inauguration speech was also screened. The Lyric was the first theater in Northern Michigan to operate Vitaphone-Movietone equipment.

As State Theatre 
The Lyric was destroyed by fire once again on January 3, 1948. It was subsequently rebuilt and reopened on June 30, 1949 with a new name, the State Theatre. The first film shown at the State was It Happens Every Spring starring Ray Milland and Jean Peters. Ticket prices were 35¢ for adults and 12¢ for children.

On September 10, 1978, the State Theatre was closed for remodeling — the owners split the single theater into a twin with two small screens. The last movie shown in the single auditorium State Theatre was The End with Burt Reynolds. The theater was operated as a twin by GKC for several years before it closed again in 1996.

The State Theatre Group and Rotary Charities kept the theater safe from weather and time while plans were made for its future. In 1996, Barry Cole and the State Theatre Group purchased the theater from GKC and announced plans to convert the State into a performing arts complex. Then, in 2003, the State Theatre Group and Interlochen Center for the Arts announced a partnership to renovate the theater. The building was donated by Rotary Charities to the Traverse City Film Festival in May 2007.

Following a complete renovation, the Traverse City Film Festival officially reopened the State Theatre on Saturday, November 17, 2007, showing The Kite Runner.

Programming 
The State Theatre offers a variety of weekly programming, from 25¢ Classic and kids matinees and Sensory friendly screenings, to Friday Night Flicks. The State also has an entire week of free screenings each year to coincide with the spring break of Traverse City Area Public Schools.

Starry Ceiling 
The twinkling stars in the State Theatre's atmospheric ceiling were mapped to exactly match the stars and constellations of the August night sky of Northern Michigan (specifically during the peak of the Perseid Meteor Shower) by Northwestern Michigan College Astronomy Professor Jerry Dobek. Over 2,000 fiber optic lights of varying sizes were installed through holes placed in the ceiling.

References

External links
Traverse City Film Festival
State Theatre
Schedule of Events

Traverse City, Michigan
Buildings and structures in Grand Traverse County, Michigan
Cinemas and movie theaters in Michigan
Theatres completed in 1923
1923 establishments in Michigan